The Mexican long-tailed shrew (Sorex oreopolus) is a species of mammal in the family Soricidae. It is endemic to Mexico.

References

Sorex
Endemic mammals of Mexico
Fauna of the Trans-Mexican Volcanic Belt
Mammals described in 1892
Taxonomy articles created by Polbot